A ternary search algorithm is a technique in computer science for finding the minimum or maximum of a unimodal function. A ternary search determines either that the minimum or maximum cannot be in the first third of the domain or that it cannot be in the last third of the domain, then repeats on the remaining two thirds. A ternary search is an example of a divide and conquer algorithm (see search algorithm).

The function 

For the algorithm to be applicable, there must be some value  such that

Algorithm 

Let  be a unimodal function on some interval  . Then there are three possibilities:
 if , then the required maximum can not be located on the left side – . It means that the maximum further makes sense to look only in the interval 
 if , that the situation is similar to the previous, up to symmetry. Now, the required maximum can not be in the right side – , so go to the segment 
Sooner or later the length of the segment will be a little less than a predetermined constant, and the process can be stopped.
choice points  and : 
 
 

 Run time order

Recursive algorithm 
def ternary_search(f, left, right, absolute_precision) -> float:
    """Left and right are the current bounds;
    the maximum is between them.
    """
    if abs(right - left) < absolute_precision:
        return (left + right) / 2

    left_third = (2*left + right) / 3
    right_third = (left + 2*right) / 3

    if f(left_third) < f(right_third):
        return ternary_search(f, left_third, right, absolute_precision)
    else:
        return ternary_search(f, left, right_third, absolute_precision)

Iterative algorithm 

def ternary_search(f, left, right, absolute_precision) -> float:
    """Find maximum of unimodal function f() within [left, right].
    To find the minimum, reverse the if/else statement or reverse the comparison.
    """
    while abs(right - left) >= absolute_precision:
        left_third = left + (right - left) / 3
        right_third = right - (right - left) / 3

        if f(left_third) < f(right_third):
            left = left_third
        else:
            right = right_third

     # Left and right are the current bounds; the maximum is between them
     return (left + right) / 2

See also
Newton's method in optimization (can be used to search for where the derivative is zero)
Golden-section search (similar to ternary search, useful if evaluating f takes most of the time per iteration)
Binary search algorithm (can be used to search for where the derivative changes in sign)
Interpolation search
Exponential search
Linear search
 N Dimensional Ternary Search Implementation

References

Search algorithms
Optimization algorithms and methods